You Blue It is a cover EP by American emo band, You Blew It!. The title is a pun on the Blue Album by Weezer (which contains the tracks the band covers) and the band's own name. It was released through Topshelf Records on July 15, 2014.

Track listing

Chart positions

References 

2014 EPs
You Blew It! EPs
Topshelf Records albums
Covers albums
Weezer tribute albums